Postgirobygget may refer to:

Postgirobygget (building), a building in Oslo, Norway
Postgirobygget (band), a Norwegian band